A Child Labour Programme of Action, sometimes called a Child Labour Action Programme or Action Programme on the Elimination of Child Labour (APEC) is a national programme aimed at addressing child labour within a given country. It includes, but is not restricted to, the Worst Forms of Child Labour.

The following countries have adopted, or plan to adopt, such a programme:

Botswana
Lesotho
Namibia
Swaziland

Child labour